The name "McBride" or "MacBride" Is an Irish surname, the English spelling for the Irish name "Mac Giolla Bhríde". The surname is also found in Scotland, it was anglicized form of Gaelic Mac Brighde, from earlier Mac Giolla Bhrighde (Irish), Mac Gille Brighde (Scottish) ‘son of the servant of (Saint) Brighid’.

The name originated in County Donegal in Ireland and later moved to Kintyre Peninsula in Scotland.  The name signifies a devotee of the Irish saint Brigid of Kildare. It is a Sept of the Ui Brolchainn Clan of the Cenél nEógain, son of Niall of the Nine Hostages.

See also 

 MacBride
 MacBride (disambiguation)
 MacBryde
 McBride (disambiguation)
 McBryde (disambiguation)

List of people surnamed McBride

A
 Alexander McBride (1833–1912), the ninth mayor of Calgary, Alberta
 Algie McBride (1869–1956), American professional baseball player
 Andrew McBride (disambiguation), various people
 Andy McBride, English footballer
 Angus McBride (1931–2007), British fantasy and historical illustrator
 Anne McBride, Canadian politician
 Arthur B. McBride (1888–1972), founder of the Cleveland Browns professional American football team

B
 Bake McBride (born 1949), Major League Baseball player
 Bernard McBride (1845–?), soldier who served with the 8th U.S. Cavalry during the Indian Wars
 Bill McBride (candidate) (born 1945), 2002 candidate for Florida governor
 Bob McBride (1946–1998), lead vocalist for the Canadian popular music group Lighthouse
 Brian McBride (born 1970), American musician
 Brian McBride (born 1955), Scottish businessman
 Brian McBride (born 1972), American football (soccer) player
 Bryan McBride (born 1991), American track and field athlete
 Bunny McBride (born 1950), American writer and anthropology lecturer

C
 Carol McBride Pirsch (born 1936), member of the Nebraska Legislature
 Catherine McBride-Chang, developmental psychologist
 Charles McBride (born 1903), Scottish sculptor
 Charlie McBride, New Zealand rugby league player
 Chase McBride, American songwriter and visual artist based in Washington, D.C.
 Chi McBride (born 1961), American actor
 Christian McBride (born 1972), American musician
 Cliff McBride (1909–1999), Canadian ice hockey player
 Clifford McBride (1901–1951), American cartoonist best known for his comic strip Napoleon and Uncle Elby
 Conor McBride (born 1973), computing science researcher and lecturer at the University of Strathclyde

D
 Damian McBride, former advisor to British government
 Daniel McBride (disambiguation), various people
 Danny McBride (disambiguation), various people
 Darl McBride (born 1959), former CEO (2002–2007) of the SCO Group
 David McBride (born 1942), American politician who has served continuously in Delaware's General Assembly since 1978
 David McBride (whistleblower) (born 1963 or 1964), Australian military lawyer and whistleblower
 Denis McBride, Scottish priest and theologian
 Denis McBride (born 1964), Irish rugby union player
 Dermot McBride (born 1988), Irish Gaelic footballer
 Dick McBride (born 1928), American poet
 Dick McBride (baseball) (1847–1916), American Major League Baseball player for the Philadelphia Athletics

E
 Edward William McBride (1791–1834), businessman and political figure in Upper Canada
 Eimear McBride, novelist, author of A Girl Is a Half-formed Thing
 Elizabeth McBride (1955–1997), American costume designer
 Ella E. McBride (1862–1965), American fine-art photographer and mountain climber
 Ernest McBride, Sr. (1909–2007), civil rights activist and community leader based in Long Beach, California

F
 Francis Scott McBride (29–1955), Presbyterian minister active in the Anti-Saloon League
 Frankie McBride (born 1944), Irish country singer

G
 Gary McBride (1980–2009), rugby league footballer for the St. George Illawarra Dragons
 George McBride (1880–1973), shortstop for the Milwaukee Brewers, Pittsburgh Pirates, St. Louis Cardinals, and the Washington Senators 
 George W. McBride (1854–1911), politician and businessman from Oregon
 Grant McBride, Australian politician

H
 Harlee McBride (born 1948), American actor
 Henry McBride (art critic) (1867–1962)
 Henry McBride (politician) (1856–1937), governor of Washington
 Horace L. McBride (1894–1962), U.S. Army General during World War II

I
 Ian McBride, professor of Irish and British history at King's College London

J
 Jack McBride Ryder (born 1928), second president of Saginaw Valley State College
 Jack McBride (1901–?), American football player who played for several teams in the NFL
 James McBride (disambiguation), various people
 Janette McBride, Australian actor
 Jean McBride, Canadian judge
 Jeff McBride (born 1959), American magician
 Jim McBride (born 1941), American television and film director and producer
 Joan McBride, American politician who was the mayor of Kirkland, Washington, from 2010 to 2013, and a member of the Washington House of Representatives
 Joe McBride (born 1938), Scottish footballer
 Joe McBride (born 1960), Scottish footballer
 John McBride (labor leader) (1854–1917), American labor union leader
 John McBride (born 1967), American photographer
 John C. McBride (born 1908), American politician
 John Paul McBride (born 1978), Scottish footballer
 John R. McBride (1832–1904), U.S. congressman from Oregon
 Johnny McBride (born 1977), Irish Gaelic footballer
 Jon McBride (filmmaker) (born 1960), American Z movie director, producer, screenwriter and actor
 Jon McBride (born 1943), American naval officer and astronaut
 Joseph McBride (born 1947), American film critic and screenwriter
 Julie McBride (born 1982), American basketball player
 Justin McBride (born 1979), American singer and rodeo performer

K
 Katharine Elizabeth McBride (1904–1976), fourth president of Bryn Mawr College
 Kayla McBride(born 1992), American professional basketball player for the San Antonio Stars
 Ken McBride (basketball) (1929–2005), American basketball player who played for the Syracuse Nationals and the Milwaukee Hawks
 Ken McBride (born 1935), Major League Baseball pitcher
Karyl McBride, American psychotherapist and author
 Kevin McBride, (born 1981) Scottish footballer
 Kevin McBride (born 1973), Irish boxer
 Kevin McBride (born 1972), Vice President of Asda
 Kirsty McBride (born 1985), Scottish footballer

M
 Macay McBride (born 1982), American baseball player
 Malcolm McBride (1878–1941), American football player and coach
 Margaret McBride, American nun
 Marion A. McBride (1850–1909), American journalist
 Martha McBride Knight (1805–1901), founding member of the Relief Society of the Church of Jesus Christ of Latter Day Saints
 Martina McBride (born 1966), American country music singer
 Mary McBride (musician), American country music singer
 Mary Margaret McBride (born 1899), American radio personality and writer
 Matt McBride (born 1985), American professional baseball right fielder and first baseman for the Colorado Rockies
 Megan McBride (born 1991), USA weightlifter 
 Melissa McBride (born 1965), American actress
 Michael McBride (disambiguation), various people
 Murray McBride (born 1935), Canadian politician

N
 Neil McBride (1910–1974), British Labour Party politician

P
 Pat McBride (born 1943), American soccer player and coach
 Patricia McBride (born 1942), New York City Ballet principal dancer
 Paul McBride (1964–2012), Scottish criminal lawyer based in Edinburgh
 Pete McBride (1875–1944), pitcher in Major League Baseball
 Peter McBride (1877–1950), Scottish association football player
 Peter McBride (physician) (1854–1946), Scottish ENT specialist
 Peter McBride (Australian politician) (1867–1923), Victorian MLA and Agent-General
 Philip McBride (1892–1982), Australian politician

R
 Reggie McBride (born 1954), American bass guitar player
 Renisha McBride (died 2013), 19-year-old African-American woman who was shot and killed after knocking on the windows of a house in Dearborn Heights, Michigan
 Sir Richard McBride, former premier of British Columbia
 Richard McBride (visual effects), visual effects supervisor
 Robert McBride (disambiguation), various people
 Ron McBride (born 1948), American footballer
 Ron McBride (born 1939), American football coach
 Roy McBride (born 1921), American ice hockey player and coach

S

 Sam McBride (1866–1936), two-time mayor of Toronto
 Sarah McBride (born 1990), American transgender LGBT rights activist from Delaware
 Scott McBride (born 1989), Scottish footballer
 Seth McBride (born 1983), American Paralympic wheelchair rugby player and five-time gold medalist from Seattle, Washington 
 Shaheer McBride (born 1985), American footballer
 Simon McBride (born 1979), (Northern) Irish singer, songwriter, producer and guitarist
 Stephen McBride (born 1983), Northern Irish footballer
 Stephen McBride (footballer, born 1964) (born 1964), Northern Irish footballer
 Steve McBride, Northern Irish politician

T
 Terry McBride (born 1960), Canadian businessman
 Terry McBride (born 1958), American musician
 Thomas McBride (born 1992), Northern Irish footballer
 Thomas A. McBride (born 1930), American attorney and judge in Oregon
 Thomas George McBride (1867–1950), member of the Canadian House of Commons
 Tod McBride (born 1976), American football player
 Tom McBride (actor) (1952–1995), American actor
 Tom McBride (baseball) (1914–2001), Major League Baseball outfielder
 Tracie McBride (died 1995), American female murder victim
 Tre McBride, American football player
Trey McBride (born 1999), American football player
 Trumaine McBride (born 1985), American football player
 Turk McBride (born 1985), American football player

V
 Vincent McBride (born 1934), association footballer who played for Walsall and Mansfield Town 
 Violet McBride (born 1954), British field hockey player who competed in the 1988 Summer Olympics

W
 Walter McBride (1904–1974), English cricketer who played for Oxford University and Hampshire 
 Will McBride (photographer) (born 1931), erotic photographer
 William McBride (doctor) (1927–2018), Australian physician
 William V. McBride (1922–2022), United States Air Force General
 Willie John McBride (born 1940), Irish rugby union player

Fictional
Clyde, Howard and Harold McBride, all from The Loud House

References

Anglicised Irish-language surnames
Irish families